Gulzarilal Nanda (4 July 1898 – 15 January 1998) was an Indian politician and economist who specialized in labour issues. He was the Interim Prime Minister of India for two 13-day tenures following the deaths of Jawaharlal Nehru in 1964 and Lal Bahadur Shastri in 1966 respectively. Both his terms ended after the ruling Indian National Congress's parliamentary party elected a new prime minister. He was awarded the Bharat Ratna, India's highest civilian award, in 1997.

Early life

Birth

Nanda was born on 4 July 1898 in Sialkot in the Punjab, British India in a Punjabi Hindu Khatri family. Sialkot later became a part of the Punjab Province of Pakistan in 1947, after the partition of  India. Nanda received his education in Lahore, Amritsar, Agra, and Allahabad.

He met Mahatma Gandhi in 1921, where he settled in Gujarat on his request.

Research worker
Nanda worked as a research scholar on labour problems at Allahabad University (1920–1921), and became a professor of economics at National College in Bombay (Mumbai) in 1921. The same year, he joined the Indian Non-Cooperation Movement against the British Raj. In 1922, he became secretary of the Ahmedabad Textile Labour Association where he worked until 1946. He was imprisoned for Satyagraha in 1932, and again from 1942 to 1944.. He was honored with "Proud Past Alumni" in the list of 42 members, from "Allahabad University Alumni Association", NCR, Ghaziabad (Greater Noida) Chapter 2007–2008 registered under society act 1860 with registration no. 407/2000.

He married Lakshmi, with whom he had two sons and a daughter.

Lok Sabha member
Nanda was elected to the Lok Sabha in the 1957 elections, and was appointed Union Minister for Labour, Employment and Planning, and later, as Deputy Chairman of the Planning Commission. He visited the Federal Republic of Germany, Yugoslavia, and Austria in 1959.

Nanda was re-elected to the Lok Sabha in the 1962 elections from the Sabarkantha constituency in Gujarat. He initiated the Congress Forum for Socialist Action in 1962. He was Union Minister for Labour and Employment in 1962–1963, and Minister for Home Affairs in 1963–1966.

Nanda was re-elected to the Lok Sabha in the 1967 and 1971 elections from the Kaithal (Lok Sabha Constituency) in Haryana.He was a principled man. In 1971, he resigned from the Congress saying that he did not like the politics of that era.

Interim Prime Minister 
Nanda was the Interim Prime Minister of India twice for thirteen days each: the first time after the death of first Prime Minister Jawaharlal Nehru in 1964, and the second time after the death of second Prime Minister Lal Bahadur Shastri in 1966. He was the Home Minister of India during both these periods, and this is the reason why he was chosen as Prime Minister. The Indian Constitution has no provision of Acting Prime Minister as is widely circulated but incorrectly. Both his terms were uneventful, yet they came at sensitive times because of the potential danger to the country following Nehru's death soon after a war with China in 1962 and Shastri's death after a war with Pakistan in 1965. Nanda died on 15 January 1998 at the age of 99; from 25 November 1997 when former Malawian President Hastings Banda died, until his own death Nanda was the oldest living former State Leader. At his death, Nanda was the last surviving member of the second and third Nehru cabinets and the last living state leader to have been born in the 19th century.

Gandhian Life 
He lived a very simple life, with no personal property at the time of his death. He never allowed politics to influence his family life. Yet he always had enough time for his family. He once engaged his government provided driver for a car that was used by his family. He never allowed his family to use his official vehicle. He once got angry with his staff when he learned that his grandson, Tejas used his office paper and drew a picture. He immediately purchased paper from market and gave his grandson to draw on it.

He was also concerned about rising corruption in the country and suggested to decrease wasteful consumption by officials and people in general. He had also opposed Indira Gandhi's Emergency, as he felt that the sacrifices to bring democracy to India became meaningless due to the tyranny.

In popular culture 
A Dedicated Worker – Shri Gulzarilal Nanda is a 1999 short documentary film directed by A. K. Goorha and produced by the Films Division of India which covers Nanda's work towards labourers and others as the PM and otherwise.

References

Further reading

 

|-

|-

|-

|-

|-

1898 births
1998 deaths
India MPs 1952–1957
India MPs 1957–1962
India MPs 1962–1967
India MPs 1967–1970
India MPs 1971–1977
Bombay State politicians
Indian Hindus
Labour ministers of India
Lok Sabha members from Gujarat
Lok Sabha members from Haryana
Ministers for External Affairs of India
Ministers of Internal Affairs of India
Ministers of Power of India
People from Sialkot
Prime Ministers of India
Punjabi people
Railway Ministers of India
Recipients of the Bharat Ratna
20th-century prime ministers of India
Recipients of the Padma Vibhushan in public affairs
University of Allahabad alumni
Swarup Rani Nehru (née Thussu, 1868 – 10 January 1938) was the wife of the barrister and Indian National Congress leader Motilal Nehru and mother of India's first prime minister, Jawaharlal Nehru